Jimmy Jazz Records is a Polish independent record label from Szczecin. It releases mostly punk rock, ska, psychobilly and hardcore music artists. The label issues its own zine Garaż. Aside from records, Jimmy Jazz sells clothes and other merchandise connected with the music it promotes.

History
Jimmy Jazz Records was started by, who had previously run Rock'n'Roller record label. Most of the bands who released their albums under Rock'n'Roller continued to co-operate with Jimmy Jazz Records.

Current artists

The Analogs
Anarchol
Anti Dread
Bang Bang (Polish band)
The Cuffs
Dumbs
The Headhunters
Karcer
Power Girls
Boy Come Men
Stars
Black & Red
Girlz68

Former artists
This includes artists whose records were released by Rock'n'Roller label, the predecessor of Jimmy Jazz records.

Bazooka Service
Beerzone
Dr Cycos
The Hunkies

Compilations
Punks, Skins & Rudeboys Now! - a series of CDs accompanying Garaż zine.
Prowadź Mnie Ulico, 2004
Prowadź Mnie Ulico Vol. 2, 2005
Tribute to Partia, 2006
Prowadź Mnie Ulico Vol. 3, 2006
Prowadź Mnie Ulico Vol. 4, 2007

External links
  Jimmy Jazz Records

Punk record labels
Hardcore record labels
Ska record labels
Polish independent record labels